Torre del Burgo is a municipality of Spain located in the province of Guadalajara, Castilla–La Mancha.

The municipality spans across a total area of 4.91 km2.

As of 1 January 2019, the municipality had a registered population of 592. It was the municipality with the largest share of foreign population in Spain (at 90.7%), the vast majority of them being Bulgarian citizens (84.6%), reportedly drawn to the village to work in the productive asparagus crops.

References

Municipalities in the Province of Guadalajara